Jong Chun-hui (born 4 March 1998) is a North Korean weightlifter, who competed in the 53 kg category and represented North Korea at international competitions. 

As a junior, she won the silver medal at the 2014 Summer Youth Olympics.

Major results

References

External links
https://www.olympic.org/news/girl-power-wows-the-fans-in-nanjing
http://www.iwf.net/2014/08/18/thailands-and-prks-outstanding-victory/
https://www.olympic.org/videos/rattanaphon-pakkaratha-wins-women-s-53kg-gold-highlights-day-2

1998 births
Living people
North Korean female weightlifters
Place of birth missing (living people)
Weightlifters at the 2014 Summer Youth Olympics
Universiade bronze medalists for North Korea
Universiade medalists in weightlifting
Medalists at the 2017 Summer Universiade
20th-century North Korean women
21st-century North Korean women